Arema FC U-20 is an Indonesian football team based in Malang, East Java.  Their first team is one of the most supported and successful football clubs in Indonesia.  They currently play at the Indonesian top league, the Elite Pro Academy U-20.

The Arema Culture
Arema is born out of the pride of the citizens of Malang.  With the desire to establish themselves as a famous and a high nobility society, the people (especially the teenagers) of Malang participated in all kinds of activities (which includes boxing, rock music and athleticism) to help establish the Malang as one of the famous societies in Indonesia.

Arema is also the name of an Indonesian/Javanese legend, Kebo Arema who is thought to originate from Malang. Due to this fact, "Arema" became a relevant name to be used for the culture and identity of Malang.

Stadiums
Arema plays up to 40,000 capacity's Kanjuruhan Stadium in Malang . In the past they played at the Gajayana Stadium, Malang for AFC Champions League matches.

Supporters
The club's supporters who call themselves as the Aremania are considered to be one of the most fanatic supporters among all of the Indonesian football clubs supporters. Apart from their home base city, the club fans are spread all around the country. In 2000 & 2006, the Aremania has been awarded as The Best Indonesian Football Supporters by Football Association of Indonesia.

Current squad

Personnel

Honours
 Indonesia Super League U-21
 3rd (group stage): 2012–13

References

External links
 Official Website
 Profile at liga-indonesia.co.id

Arema F.C.
Football clubs in Indonesia